For You I Will may refer to:

"For You I Will" (Aaron Tippin song)
"For You I Will" (Monica song)
"For You I Will (Confidence)", a song by Teddy Geiger